Seez may mean:

 Seez (river), a river in the canton of St. Gallen, Switzerland
 Sées, Orne, a town in north-western France, traditionally known as Séez
 Roman Catholic Diocese of Séez, a diocese in Sées
 Séez, Savoie, France